Nikola Smiljanić (Badovinci, c. 1760  - Belotić, 1815 ) was a Serbian Orthodox priest and voivode in the First Serbian Uprising and Second Serbian Uprising.

Biography
He was born in the village of Badovinci around 1760 and grew up in Belotić and Šabac. As a young man, Nikola Smiljanić was adopted by Jeka Radojičina, a widow, who was engaged in trade in Šabac and who funded his education at the seminary. She married him before he was ordained a deacon and priest. As a deacon, Nikola Smiljanić was a teacher in Belotic for a while before taking part in both the first and second insurrection. Marko Štitarac poisoned him on the orders of Prince Miloš Obrenović for being loyal to Karađorđe.

Archpriest Nikola Smiljanić had a daughter who married Jovan Radovanović, a merchant in Šabac called "Ćurčija".

Sources
Milan Milićević: "Monument of famous people in the Serbian people of recent times", determinant "Smiljanić Nikola", p. 652-654, Belgrade, 1888
Official website of the Municipality of Bogatić, Accessed April 15, 2013.

References 

1760 births
1815 deaths

First Serbian Uprising
Second Serbian Uprising
Serbian Orthodox clergy